Arahuay is a village in Canta Province, Lima Region, Peru, South America. It is the seat of Arahuay District. Its geographical coordinates are 11° 37' 20" South, 76° 40' 10" West. "Arahuay is located 22 kilometres away from Santa Rosa de Quives, at over 2300 metres above sea level, and pierced over a small valley. The small town is surrounded by pre-Inca archaeological remains and a cluster of blue lagoons."

One Laptop Per Child
Arahuay is the town where the first Peru OLPC pilot was implemented in 2007. "Since May 2007 Peru has been evaluating the XO laptop with 60 school children in Arahuay, a remote agricultural village in the Andes mountains."

References and notes

Further reading
http://wiki.laptop.org/go/OLPC_Peru/Arahuay

Populated places in the Lima Region